Mercy San Juan Medical Center is a not-for-profit hospital located in Carmichael, California serving the areas of north Sacramento County and south Placer County. It is home to Sacramento's first Comprehensive Stroke Center.

Patient tower
A six-story patient tower opened in December 2009, adding 110 beds.

References

External links
This hospital in the CA Healthcare Atlas A project by OSHPD

Hospital buildings completed in 1967
Hospital buildings completed in 2009
Carmichael, California
Hospitals in Sacramento County, California
Dignity Health
Christian hospitals
Hospitals established in 1967
1967 establishments in California
Trauma centers